Damien Burke is a former Gaelic footballer from Corofin, County Galway. He played with his local club Corofin and the Galway senior team from 2004 until 2012.

References

Year of birth missing (living people)
Living people
Corofin Gaelic footballers
Galway inter-county Gaelic footballers